Vallonia suevica is a species of small, air-breathing land snail, a terrestrial, pulmonate gastropod mollusk in the family Valloniidae.

Distribution
The distribution of this species includes Germany and Luxembourg. Its presence in Austria and in Italy is uncertain.

It was listed as a Data Deficient species in the 1996 IUCN Red List of Threatened Species.

References

Valloniidae
Gastropods described in 1908
Taxonomy articles created by Polbot